Expansive, formerly Novel Coworking, is an American co-working and office rental company. Its main clientele are small businesses, such as entrepreneurs and satellite office teams, needing flexible office space.

Background 
Expansive was founded under the name Level Office by Chicago entrepreneur Bill Bennett in 2013. The idea was initially conceived in 2007, when Bennett couldn't find flexible, short-term office space for his first business.

The original venue is located at 73 W. Monroe Street in Chicago's Loop, and was opened in September 2013, followed by two more locations in the Loop in 2014. In late 2014 and early 2015, the company expanded to Texas with two locations in downtown Houston and one in downtown Dallas. 

In August 2015, Expansive opened its seventh center, in Charlotte, North Carolina's Uptown neighborhood. In December 2015, Expansive purchased the historic Pioneer Building in Seattle's Pioneer Square neighborhood. The company renovated the building's interior to create private offices and co-working space for Seattle small businesses. 

The company added a location in Jacksonville, Florida's historic Groover Stewart building in February 2016. Expansive now has 41 locations through out 39 cities nationwide. 

In August 2018, the company rebranded as Novel Coworking.  

In June of 2021, the company rebranded as Expansive.

References

External links 
 expansive.com

Real estate services companies of the United States
Leasing companies